Götz George (23 July 1938 – 19 June 2016) was a German actor, the son of actor couple Berta Drews and Heinrich George. His arguably best-known role is that of Duisburg detective Horst Schimanski in the TV crime series Tatort.

Early life
George was born in Berlin-Wannsee into a well known acting family: his father, Heinrich George, was a famous film and theater actor, and his mother, Berta Drews, a character actress. George is named after his father's favorite, Imperial Knight Götz von Berlichingen. His father was imprisoned by the Soviets and starved in the Soviet concentration camp NKVD special camp Nr. 7. George grew up in Berlin with his elder brother Jan and his mother. He attended school in Berlin-Lichterfelde and later attended the Lyzeum Alpinum in Zuoz, Switzerland.

Acting career

Stage
George made his stage debut in 1950, performing a role in William Saroyan's My Heart's in the Highlands. From 1955 to 1958 he also studied at the Berlin UFA-Nachwuchsstudio, though he received the crucial part of his acting education between 1958 and 1963. Following his mother's advice he occasionally played at the Deutsches Theater in Göttingen under the direction of Heinz Hilpert. After Hilpert's death, George would never join a fixed theater company again, although he did regularly perform on tours and as a guest performer.

Hansgünther Heyme signed him in 1972 to the Kölner Schauspielhaus, where George played Martin Luther in Dieter Forte's Martin Luther und Thomas Münzer. His most important stage achievement, in his own opinion, was the lead role in Büchner's Danton's Death during the Salzburg Festival in 1981. In 1986 and 1987, George, together with Eberhard Feik and Helmut Stauss, stage-managed Gogol's The Government Inspector. Performing in Anton Chekhov's Platonov, George went on his last theater tour.

Cinema and television

In 1953, he was able to get a small film role next to Romy Schneider in When the White Lilacs Bloom Again. In the same year he played, as he would often do from then on, next to his mother in Shakespeare's Richard III. After small movie parts during the 1950s, Götz George broke through with audiences and critics in the film Jacqueline (1959). George was awarded the Bundesfilmpreis and the Preis der Filmkritik for his role. In 1962 he received the Bambi Award as the most popular actor.

In the sixties, George got the chance to show that he is able to do more than playing sappy peasants, through roles in movies such as Kirmes, playing a desperate Wehrmacht deserter, and Herrenpartie. More often, though, he performed in comedies and action-oriented movies which benefited from his physical presence. He became well known to a broad audience when, during his theater tour in Göttingen, Horst Wendlandt persuaded him to play in one of the Karl May series of films, which he started in 1962 with Der Schatz im Silbersee. It was originally planned to give him the lead role, but this plan was abandoned when Lex Barker was hired to play the role of Old Shatterhand, so George played the farmer son Fred Engel. George performed all stunts himself, even in his lead role as sheriff in Sie nannten ihn Gringo.

In the 1970s, he turned primarily to stage roles and to television, including the many episodes of Der Kommissar, Tatort, Derrick, and The Old Fox for which he would become famous. It was not until 1977 that he was cast in a prominent role again, playing Franz Lang in Death Is My Trade, a character modeled after Auschwitz commander Rudolf Höß.

George probably had his greatest popular success in the eighties on TV: in Tatort episodes of the WDR, broadcast from 1981 to 1991, he portrayed working-class police officer Horst Schimanski, who eventually became a cult figure in Germany. In 1984 and 1987 he again won the Bambi Award as the most popular actor. The series of Schulz & Schulz movies, starting in 1989 and dealing with the issue of the German reunification, gave him the opportunity to show his talents as a comedian in a double role, as did the role of the industry consultant  in the series of the same name, which is rather far removed from the roughneck charm of senior commissar Schimanski.

Among George's most impressive roles in the nineties were his appearances in the television movie , in which he portrayed the alleged serial killer and writer Henry Kupfer as a cold, calculating and manipulative intellectual, the movie Deathmaker (Der Totmacher), in which he portrayed Fritz Haarmann (The Butcher of Hanover), and in the television movie  (based on Bubi Scholz), the trauma of an aged, broken boxer.

Personal life and death 
George was married to Loni von Friedl from 1966 to 1976; the couple's daughter, Tanja-Nicole, was born in 1967. From 1997, he lived together with Hamburg journalist Marika Ullrich; the couple married in 2014.

He died in 2016 at the age of 77 after a short illness.

Awards 

1995: Bavarian Film Award, Best Actor
 1995: Volpi Cup, Best Actor

Filmography (movies) 

 When the White Lilacs Bloom Again, 1953 ... Klaus
 The Great Test, 1954 ... Peter Behrend
 Old Barge, Young Love (Alter Kahn und junge Liebe  Sonne über den Seen), 1957 ... Kalle Borchert 
 , 1958 ... Eberhard Römer
 Jacqueline, 1959 ... Gustav Bäumler
 The Fair (Kirmes), 1960 ... Robert Mertens
 Carnival Confession, 1960 ... Clemens
 , 1961 ... Peter Joost
 , 1961 ... Hein Kersten
 Our House in Cameroon, 1961 ... Georg Ambrock
 Her Most Beautiful Day, 1962 ... Adam Kowalski
 Das Mädchen und der Staatsanwalt, 1962 ... Jochen Rehbert
 Treasure of the Silver Lake (Der Schatz im Silbersee), 1962 ... Fred Engel
 , 1962 ... Chris Kronberger
 Love Has to Be Learned, 1963 ... Hansgeorg Lehmbruck
 Man and Beast (Mensch und Bestie), 1963 ... Franz
 Destination Death (Herrenpartie), 1964 ... Herbert Hackländer
 Waiting Room to the Beyond (Wartezimmer zum Jenseits), 1964 ... Don Micklem
 Among Vultures (Unter Geiern), 1964 ... Martin Baumann Jr.
 A Holiday with Piroschka, 1965 ... Thomas Laurends
 Man Called Gringo (Sie nannten ihn Gringo), 1965 ... Mace Carson
 Winnetou and the Crossbreed, 1966 ... Jeff Brown
 The Long Day of Inspector Blomfield, 1968 ... Eddie Blomfield
 The Blood of Fu Manchu, 1968 ... Carl Jansen
 Commandos, 1968 ... Oberleutnant Rudi
 Wind from the East, 1970 ... Soldier
 Death is My Trade, 1977 ... Franz Lang (based on Rudolf Höss)
 Abwärts, 1984 ... Jörg
 , 1985 ... Horst Schimanski
 , 1987 ... Horst Schimanski
 The Cat, 1988 ... Probek
 , 1989 ... Walter Graf
 , 1989 ... Johann Neudorf
 Schtonk!, 1992 ... Hermann Willié
 , 1993 ... Bruno
 , 1995 ... Robot Max
 Deathmaker (Der Totmacher) 1995 ... Fritz Haarmann
 , 1997 ... Uhu Zigeuner
 , 1998 ... Zobel
 , 1998 ... Bernie Kominka
 After the Truth (Nichts als die Wahrheit), 1999 ... Dr. Mengele
 Viktor Vogel – Commercial Man, 2001 ... Eddie Kaminsky
 Gott ist tot, 2003 ... Heinrich Lutter
 , 2006 ... Jost
 Mein Kampf ( Dawn of Evil), 2009 ... Schlomo Herzl
 , 2012 ... Chancellor Olli Ebert

Filmography (made-for-TV movies and series) 

 Kolportage, 1957 ... Erik Stjernenhö
 Alle meine Söhne, 1961 ... Christian Keller 
 Alle meine Söhne, 1965 ... Chris Keller
 Der Werbeoffizier, 1967 ... Captain Plume
 Schlehmihls wundersame Geschichte, 1967 ... Peter Schlemihl
 Match, 1968 ... André
 Der Eismann kommt, 1968 ... Rocky Pioggi
 Spion unter der Haube, 1969 ... Cazmio
 Ein Jahr ohne Sonntag, 1969 (TV series, 13 episodes) ... Robert Sonntag
 11 Uhr 20, 1970 (TV miniseries) ... Mûller
 Der Kommissar: Tod einer Zeugin, 1970 ... Wolfgang Karrass
 Tatort: , 1971 ... Joachim Seidel
 Diamantendetektiv Dick Donald, 1971 (TV series, 13 episodes) ... Dick Donald
 Der Kommissar: Der Amoklauf, 1972 ... Paul Neumann
 Der Illegale, 1972 ... Nikolai Grunwaldt / Kurt Blohm
 Tatort: , 1972 ... Jerry
 Kesselflickers Hochzeit, 1972 ... Michael Byrne
 Die Gräfin von Rathenow, 1973 ... Leopold
 Der Kommissar: Sommerpension, 1973 ... Gottfried Schuster
 Zwischen den Flügen, 1973 (TV series, 1 episode)
 Mandragola, 1974 ... Siro
 Tatort: , 1976 ... Martin
 Hungária kávéház (Café Hungaria), 1977 (TV series, 1 episode) ... Hadnagy
 Polizeiinspektion 1: Verfolgungswahn, 1977 ... Alfred Neumeier
 Les Diamants du président (The Pawn), 1977 (TV miniseries) ... Pierre Vidal
 Vermutungen über Franz Bieberkopf, 1977
 Derrick - Season 5, Episode 10: "Der Spitzel" (1978) ... Georg Lukas
 The Old Fox: Der schöne Alex, 1978 ... Alex Bergemann
 The Old Fox: Der Auftraggeber, 1979 ... Martens
 , 1980 (TV series) ... Victor
 Überfall in Glasgow, 1981 ... Craig Kennan
 Tatort: , 1981 ... Horst Schimanski
 , 1981 ... Frederick William I of Prussia
 Dantons Tod, 1981 ... Danton
 Tatort: , 1981 ... Horst Schimanski
 Tatort: , 1982 ... Horst Schimanski
 Der Regenmacher, 1982 ... Bill Starbuck
 Tatort: , 1982 ... Horst Schimanski
 Tatort: , 1982 ... Horst Schimanski
 Tatort: , 1983 ... Horst Schimanski
 , 1984 ... Craig Murray
 Tatort: , 1984 ... Horst Schimanski
 Tatort: , 1984 ... Horst Schimanski
 Overheard, 1984 ... Bozidar Popkov-Prokop
 Tatort: , 1984 ... Horst Schimanski
 Tatort: , 1985 ... Horst Schimanski
 Tatort: , 1985 ... Horst Schimanski
 Tatort: , 1985 (theatrically released) ... Horst Schimanski
 Tatort: , 1986 ... Horst Schimanski
 Tatort: , 1986 ... Horst Schimanski
 Tatort: , 1986 ... Horst Schimanski
 Tatort: , 1987 (theatrically released) ... Horst Schimanski
 Tatort: , 1987 ... Horst Schimanski
 Tatort: , 1988 ... Horst Schimanski
 Tatort: , 1988 ... Horst Schimanski
 Tatort: , 1988 ... Horst Schimanski
 Tatort: , 1989 ... Horst Schimanski
 Tatort: , 1989 ... Horst Schimanski
 Spielen willst du ja alles. Götz George – rastlos im Einsatz, 1989
 Tatort: , 1989 ... Horst Schimanski
 Schulz & Schulz, 1989 ... Walter Schulz and Wolfgang Schulz
 Tatort: , 1990 ... Horst Schimanski
 Tatort: , 1990 ... Horst Schimanski
 Tatort / Polizeiruf 110: , 1990 ... Horst Schimanski
 Schulz & Schulz 2: Aller Anfang ist schwer, 1991 ... Walter Schulz and Wolfgang Schulz
 Tatort: , 1991 ... Horst Schimanski
 Tatort: , 1991 ... Horst Schimanski
 Tatort: , 1991 ... Horst Schimanski
 Schulz & Schulz 3: Wechselspiele, 1992 ... Walter Schulz and Wolfgang Schulz
 Schulz & Schulz 4: Neue Welten, alte Lasten, 1992 ... Walter Schulz and Wolfgang Schulz
 : Kinderkram, 1993 ... Carl Morlock
 : Die Verflechtung, 1993 ... Carl Morlock
 : König Midas, 1993 ... Carl Morlock
 Schulz & Schulz 5: Fünf vor zwölf, 1993 ... Walter Schulz and Wolfgang Schulz
 : Der Tunnel, 1994 ... Carl Morlock
 , 1995 (TV miniseries) ... Stefan Stolze
 Der König von Dulsberg, 1995 ... Bruno Bülle
 , 1995 ... Henry Kupfer
 Der Mann auf der Bettkante, 1995 ... Jack Förnbeisser
 Tote sterben niemals aus, 1996 ... Benno / Theobald
 Gates of Fire, 1996 ... Harry Kowa
 Schimanski: , 1997 ... Horst Schimanski
 Schimanski: , 1997 ... Horst Schimanski
 Schimanski: , 1997 ... Horst Schimanski
 Schimanski: , 1998 ... Horst Schimanski
 Schimanski: , 1998 ... Horst Schimanski
 Schimanski: , 1998 ... Horst Schimanski
 , 1998/99 ... Bubi Scholz
 Die Entführung, 1999 ... Carl Heidfeld
 Racheengel – Stimme aus dem Dunkeln, 1999 ... Dr. Meinfeld
 Schimanski: , 1999 ... Horst Schimanski
 Die Spur meiner Tochter ( Element des Todes), 1999 ... Paul Flemming
 Schimanski: Tödliche Liebe, 2000 ... Horst Schimanski
 Schimanski: , 2000 ... Horst Schimanski
 Bargeld lacht, 2001 ... Harry Freundner
 Schimanski: , 2001 ... Horst Schimanski
 Liebe. Macht. Blind., 2001 ... Alexander Stahlberg
 Mein Vater, 2002 ... Richard Esser
 Liebe ist die halbe Miete, 2002 ... Dr. Gottfried Naumann
 Schimanski: , 2002 ... Horst Schimanski
 Verliebte Diebe, 2002 ... Vinzenz Kröger
 Der Anwalt und sein Gast, 2002 ... Frank Karmann
 Geheimnisvolle Freundinnen, 2003 ... Sandmann
 Familienkreise, 2003 ... Raimund Parz
 Alpenglühen, 2003 ... Hannes Seeger
 René Deltgen – Der sanfte Rebell, 2004
 Schimanski: , 2004 ... Horst Schimanski
 Blatt und Blüte – Die Erbschaft, 2004 ... Vincent Gottwald
 Alpenglühen zwei – Liebe versetzt Berge, 2005 ... Hannes Seeger
 , 2005 ... Larry
 , 2005 ... John Schlesinger
 , 2005 ... President von Walter
 Schimanski: , 2005 ... Horst Schimanski
 , 2006 ... Jens Urban
 Commissario Laurenti: Die Toten vom Karst, 2006 ... Antonio Gubian
 Als der Fremde kam, 2006 ... Dr. Robert Stubenrauch
 Schimanski: , 2007 ... Horst Schimanski
 , 2007 ... Henry Lichtfeld
 Die Katze, 2007 ... Siegmar
 Meine fremde Tochter, 2008 ... Johann Bergkamp
 Schimanski: , 2008 ... Horst Schimanski
 , 2008 ... Ernst Schmitt
 , 2010 ... Peter Jordan
 , 2010 ... Hape Wegener
 Schimanski: , 2011 ... Horst Schimanski
 Papa allein zu Haus, 2011 ... Theo Winter
 : , 2011 ... Bruno Markowitz
 Nacht ohne Morgen, 2011 ... Jasper Dänert
 , 2012 ... Bruno Theweleit
 , 2012 ... Prof. Arthur Noswitz
 , 2013 ... Heinrich George
 Schimanski: , 2013 ... Horst Schimanski
 , 2014 ... Joseph Komalschek
 , 2016 ... Friedrich Türnitz

References

External links 

 
 goetz-george.de  

1938 births
2016 deaths
Male actors from Berlin
German male stage actors
German male film actors
German male television actors
20th-century German male actors
21st-century German male actors
Volpi Cup for Best Actor winners
German Film Award winners
Commanders Crosses of the Order of Merit of the Federal Republic of Germany
Recipients of the Order of Merit of Berlin
People from Steglitz-Zehlendorf